Lucien Edward "Lefty" Gervais (July 6, 1890 – October 19, 1950) was a pitcher in Major League Baseball. He played for the Boston Braves in 1913.

References

External links

1890 births
1950 deaths
Major League Baseball pitchers
Boston Braves players
Baseball players from Wisconsin
Vancouver Beavers players
Buffalo Bisons (minor league) players
Bridgeport Crossmen players
Winnipeg Maroons (baseball) players
People from Marinette County, Wisconsin